Stern John, CM (born 30 October 1976) is a Trinidadian football manager and former player who is currently managing Saint Lucia. He managed Anguilla from 2020 to 2022. He previously played for a number of American and English football clubs that included Columbus Crew, Nottingham Forest, Birmingham City, Coventry City, Derby County, Sunderland, Southampton, Bristol City, Crystal Palace and Ipswich Town.

Club career

Early U.S. career

John was born in Tunapuna, Trinidad and Tobago, to a sporting family that included several professional footballers and cricket players. He played on the Trinidad and Tobago cricket youth national team until age 16, when he switched to playing soccer full-time. John moved to the United States in 1995 to attend New Jersey's Mercer County Community College. He had been recruited in Trinidad by the college's head coach, Charlie Inverso, who had previously sought international talent. John led the Mercer County Vikings to the 1995 NJCAA soccer championship and scored 27 goals, including one in the final against Yavapai College.

He made his professional debut for the Carolina Dynamo of the A-League, the second division of U.S. club soccer, in April 1997 while on loan from the Trinidad and Tobago Football Association. John was traded to the New Orleans Riverboat Gamblers for Jamie Wellington a month later, having not scored a goal in five appearances for Carolina. With New Orleans, where he was paired with fellow Trinidadian forward Mickey Trotman, John scored 16 goals in 21 appearances and was named Rookie of the Year.

John was invited by the New England Revolution to their 1998 preseason camp, but was not retained after his trial. Following the 1998 CONCACAF Gold Cup, where he scored two goals, John was invited for a walk-on trial by the Columbus Crew. His second cousin Ansil Elcock, a fellow Trinidad and Tobago international who had been signed by the Crew, had recommended John to head coach Tom Fitzgerald. Following a successful trial, John was signed and made his Major League Soccer debut on 29 March 1998 against the Dallas Burn, where he replaced Elcock but failed to score. He scored his first MLS goal in his fifth appearance, a 5–1 victory over the Miami Fusion, and ended the match with a hat-trick and an assist. John ended his rookie MLS season as the league scoring champion with 26 goals in 27 matches and a place in the MLS Best XI. He was the first MLS player to score three hat-tricks in a single season, including 16 goals in a span of 12 matches.

He scored 18 goals in the 1999 season, tied for the league's scoring leaderboard, and attracted interest from European clubs but declined a mid-season transfer. He ended his MLS career with 44 goals in 55 matches.

Nottingham Forest
After the 1999 season with Columbus, John was acquired by Nottingham Forest of the English First Division for a fee of £1.5 million. However, eventual financial difficulties at Forest following the team's failed bid at promotion forced John's sale to Birmingham City in February 2002, then pushing for promotion to the Premier League, for the sum of £100,000. John scored 18 goals in 49 starts for Forest.

Birmingham City
At Birmingham, John scored nine goals in 60 Premier League appearances in two full seasons and was effective with his hold up play and also had some memorable moments in the blue shirt of Birmingham, such as his turn and finish away at West Ham in 2002; his last minute equaliser at Villa Park in the Birmingham derby; and his last minute goal away at Millwall which put Birmingham through to the Playoff Final in 2002. He then scored one of the penalties in the play-off final shootout to help them get promoted to the Premier League. Popular with the Birmingham fans for his goals, he nonetheless fell out of favour with management, and was sold to Coventry City on 14 September 2004.

Coventry City
In his first season with Coventry, John finished second in team scoring with 12 goals despite starting in barely half of Coventry's games.

Derby County
At the start of the 2005–06 season, following the signing of James Scowcroft, John found himself outside of manager Micky Adams's first-team plans. As a result, he was loaned to Derby County on 16 September 2005. He rejoined Coventry three months later.

Sunderland
On 29 January 2007, John was transferred to Sunderland for an undisclosed fee. The signing was Sunderland manager Roy Keane's sixth signing of the 2006–07 season January transfer window. He scored his first goals against Southend United in a 4–0 victory on 17 February 2007.

Southampton
On 29 August 2007, John moved to Southampton as part of a deal that took his international teammate Kenwyne Jones in the opposite direction.

He scored his first goals with two in a 3–2 win against West Bromwich Albion on 6 October 2007. From then on he scored regularly for "The Saints", with nine goals in his first fifteen appearances, including a second half hat trick against Hull City on 8 December 2007. He finished the 2007–08 season fourth highest scorer in the Championship with 19 goals for Southampton. (He had also scored once for Sunderland in the Premier League prior to his transfer.) Before being sent off for a second bookable offence, John scored two goals, including the match winner, in Southampton's final game of the season against Sheffield United, as the Saints narrowly avoided relegation to League One.

Bristol City
John was loaned to Bristol City in October 2008 until the end of the 2008–09 season. John made his first Bristol City appearance, coming on as a substitute, against Barnsley in a 0–0 draw. John scored his first goal for Bristol City in a 4–1 defeat to Reading at Ashton Gate Stadium on 1 November 2008.

Crystal Palace
On 29 July 2009, John signed for Crystal Palace on a year-long deal after turning down an offer to stay at Southampton. He made his debut on the opening day of the season against Plymouth Argyle, he had to come off after 35 minutes due to an injury. He returned in mid-October, but joined Ipswich Town on a one-month loan at the end of November. He scored his first goal for Ipswich in a 3–2 win over Coventry City on 16 January 2010. Upon his return to Palace he scored his first goal for the club in a 3–1 win at Watford on 30 March 2010.
New Palace manager George Burley had hoped to discuss the player's future at the end of the season, but no discussion occurred, and John left the club.

Solihull Moors
In August 2012, after two seasons out of English football, John returned, signing for Solihull Moors. He did not make an appearance in any competition for the club.

WASA FC
John retired and moved back to his native Trinidad and Tobago after his spell at Solihull Moors. He came out of retirement a second time in order to join WASA FC of the National Super League of Trinidad and Tobago in January 2014. He scored on his debut

Central F.C.
John came out of retirement once again in 2016 when he was appointed as player-coach of Central F.C. in the TT Pro League.

International career
John made his international debut for Trinidad and Tobago national team on 15 February 1995 against Finland in a friendly at the Queen's Park Oval, scoring one goal on his debut. He was a vital player for the Soca Warriors and remains the team's all-time leading scorer with 70 goals in 115 caps. He was also the 7th highest international goalscorer at the time of his retirement in 2011. He is also the all-time top CONCACAF goal scorer.

John was instrumental in helping his country qualify for the 2006 FIFA World Cup and played in all three of his country's World Cup group matches at Germany 2006. In Germany, he scored an offside goal. He was also named Trinidad and Tobago Football Federation Player of the Year in 2002. John is currently the second most capped Trinidad and Tobago international behind former teammate Angus Eve. He was the only player to score in 12 consecutive international matches, from 1998 to 1999.

Coaching career
On 9 November 2020, John become the new manager of the Anguilla national team. On 23 May 2022, the Saint Lucia Football Association announced that John had taken over as head coach of the Saint Lucia national team.

Personal life
As a member of the squad that competed at the 2006 FIFA World Cup in Germany, John was awarded the Chaconia Medal (Gold Class), the second highest state decoration of Trinidad and Tobago.

Career statistics

Club

International
Source:

Scores and results list Trinidad and Tobago's goal tally first, score column indicates score after each John goal.''

Honours
Columbus Crew
U.S. Open Cup runner-up: 1998

Birmingham City
Football League First Division play-offs: 2001–02

Sunderland
Football League Championship: 2006–07

Trinidad and Tobago
Caribbean Cup: 1996, 1999, 2001

Individual
MLS Golden Boot: 1998
MLS Best XI: 1998
Trinidad and Tobago Football Federation Player of the Year: 2002

Medals
 Chaconia Medal Gold Class: 2006

See also
List of top international men's football goalscorers by country
List of men's footballers with 100 or more international caps
List of men's footballers with 50 or more international goals

References

External links
Player profile from Southampton F.C. website (via archive.org)

1976 births
Living people
People from Tunapuna–Piarco
Trinidad and Tobago footballers
Association football forwards
Mercer County Community College alumni
North Carolina Fusion U23 players
New Orleans Riverboat Gamblers players
Columbus Crew players
Nottingham Forest F.C. players
Birmingham City F.C. players
Coventry City F.C. players
Derby County F.C. players
Sunderland A.F.C. players
Southampton F.C. players
Bristol City F.C. players
Crystal Palace F.C. players
Ipswich Town F.C. players
North East Stars F.C. players
Solihull Moors F.C. players
USISL players
USL First Division players
Major League Soccer players
Major League Soccer All-Stars
Premier League players
English Football League players
TT Pro League players
Trinidad and Tobago international footballers
1998 CONCACAF Gold Cup players
2002 CONCACAF Gold Cup players
2005 CONCACAF Gold Cup players
2006 FIFA World Cup players
FIFA Century Club
Trinidad and Tobago expatriate footballers
Trinidad and Tobago expatriate sportspeople in the United States
Trinidad and Tobago expatriate sportspeople in England
Expatriate soccer players in the United States
Expatriate footballers in England
Trinidad and Tobago football managers
Central F.C. managers
TT Pro League managers
Recipients of the Chaconia Medal
Expatriate football managers in Anguilla
Trinidad and Tobago expatriate sportspeople in Anguilla
Anguilla national football team managers
Trinidad and Tobago expatriate football managers